Ko Ko Thett (stylised as ko ko thett; born in 1972 in Rangoon) is a Burmese poet and writer based in Norwich, United Kingdom. He has written under the pen name Jet Ni. Ko Ko Thett has published poetry anthologies and translations in both Burmese and English. In 1995, Ko Ko Thett began studying engineering at the Yangon Technological University, where he began publishing samizdat poems. He was detained the following year for his involvement in the December 1996 student uprising. Upon his release in April 1997, he left the country. In 2012, he won the 2012 English PEN Writers in Translation Programme Award for Bones will Crow, an anthology of 15 contemporary Burmese poets.

Works 

 Bones Will Crow: 15 Contemporary Burmese Poets (2012)
 The Burden of Being Burmese (2015)
 Foo Foo Thett’s Page on an Internet Dating Site (2016)
 ACCENT (2018)
 Bamboophobia (2022)

References

External links 
 

Burmese writers
Burmese male poets
20th-century Burmese poets
20th-century male writers
21st-century Burmese poets
21st-century male writers
1972 births
People from Yangon
Prisoners and detainees of Myanmar
Burmese emigrants to the United Kingdom
Living people